Zero Tolerance is a 1994 video game developed by Technopop and published by Accolade exclusively for the Mega Drive/Genesis. It was one of the very few first-person shooters for the console, along with Bloodshot and Duke Nukem 3D.

Plot
The game takes place in a future where mankind has made great advances in interstellar travel and subsequently colonized the Solar System. There are extrasolar settlements, research outposts, mines, commercial colonies, and spacecraft and space stations throughout the Solar System are protected by an interstellar military conglomerate named the Planet Defense Corps.

When Europa-1, the flagship of the Planet Defense Corps, is attacked by an unknown yet lethal aggressor of extraterrestrial nature, the Planet Defense Corps call in Zero Tolerance, an elite strike squad containing five specialty-trained commandos. A recording of Europa-1's last transmission shows that there was a lot of fire damage to the warship, that almost everyone on board died, and that strange creatures were looking for the few people who managed to escape the attack. Additionally, the nuclear cooling system of Europa-1 has been damaged by a small arms fire, and a core breach caused by overheating will destroy the star ship in a matter of hours.

During the crisis briefing, the player character is told to sneak into Europa-1 before it blows up as a member of the Zero Tolerance squad. Their mission is to eliminate the mysterious alien aggressor from within and the transformed humans of Europa-1 that have been "infected" in the next few hours to erase all evidence of the attack and the alien intruders.

Gameplay

Zero Tolerance has 40 levels spread out over three different areas: the space warship Europa-1, an abandoned merchant freighter, the Planet Defense Corps' heavily fortified central command building, and the sub-basement areas of that building. The objective of the game is to kill all of the enemies on a level and then proceed to the exit, which is either a staircase or elevator leading down to the next level.

However, nothing prevents the player from heading straight toward the exit without killing all of the enemies.  If this is done, the player is simply not given any passwords until the entire area is finished.

When a character is killed, he or she is marked as "deceased" and is no longer playable. The player can choose from a total of five different characters; once they are all deceased, the game is over.

For multiplayer mode, the game supported connecting two Genesis or Mega Drives using a special link cable and the second joypad port. The cable was originally supposed to be shipped as a pack-in with the game. However, this was changed in a last-minute decision, and a coupon for ordering a free cable was added instead.

Reception
GamePro gave the game a mostly positive review, commenting that “first-person games like Zero Tolerance put pressure on a system's processor, but Accolade has done a good job here: The anxiety caused by an adversary careening around a corner or the twitching body of a gunned-down spider is severe.” They additionally praised the large and labyrinthine levels, cooperative multiplayer ability, and limited but effective sound effects, though they criticized a few elements, such as how slowly the player character turns. The four reviewers of Electronic Gaming Monthly had varying reactions to Zero Tolerance but generally agreed that it was an effective substitute for Wolfenstein 3D and Doom on the Genesis. They received a 7.5 out of 10 rating. Game Informer rated it 8 out of 10. Power Unlimited gave the game a score of 70 out of 100 praising the 2-player mode and commented that "Apart from the flamethrower, it offers nothing new.

Legacy
A sequel, called Beyond Zero Tolerance (or Zero Tolerance 2), ⁣ was in development by Technopop for the Sega Mega Drive/Genesis, but its production has been cancelled. A letter-writing campaign for Accolade to release the game was started and did not succeed. The ROMs of the game and its sequel were offered by the owner for free download later. In Beyond Zero Tolerance, the player character has to go to the alien motherland and kill every living thing there.

In October 2005, Eidos Interactive announced a game titled Zero Tolerance: City Under Fire for PS2 and Xbox. Technopop's former president and owner of its assets, Randel B. Reiss, made a statement in which he held the copyright for the title Zero Tolerance, and also announced that he was working on an updated version of the classic Zero Tolerance under the same title which was developed for the PSP; the statement alleged trademark infringement on Reiss' trademark and sent a “cease and desist” notice to Eidos Interactive in using the title Zero Tolerance. Eidos later renamed their game Urban Chaos: Riot Response.

On April 21, 2022, Piko Interactive and Strictly Limited Games announced the Zero Tolerance Collection being developed by QUByte Interactive. The Zero Tolerance Collection will contain the original game, now called Zero Tolerance Origins, its previously unreleased sequel, Zero Tolerance Underground, and the prototype for Beyond Zero Tolerance. Zero Tolerance Collection is planned to be released on Nintendo Switch and PlayStation 4 with Zero Tolerance Origins also being re-released on Sega Genesis/Mega Drive as a limited physical run. Zero Tolerance Collection was released on July 7th, 2022.

See also
 List of commercial games released as freeware

References

External links
 

1994 video games
Accolade (company) games
First-person shooters
Freeware games
Multiplayer and single-player video games
Sega Genesis games
Sega Genesis-only games
Sprite-based first-person shooters
Video games developed in the United States
Video games featuring female protagonists
Video games with 2.5D graphics